The Perumal Engineering College is a co-educational engineering college in Madipakkam near Velachery, a rapidly developing suburban area of Chennai, India.

The college is 2.1 km from the Madras Flying Club near the Meenambakkam Airport and National Highway 45 (India) (also known as the Great Southern Trunk Road). Important landmarks are nearby like the St. Thomas Mount which is barely 2 km to the north and just 10 minutes from the college.

History

The Perumal Engineering College was established as a private self-financed engineering college in 2006. It previously operated as the Perumal Educational Society from 2003. It was initially affiliated to University of Madras. To better its standing, the process of accreditation and affiliation with Anna University was initiated in 2007 and TPEC will become part of the Anna University system within the next 5 years. It offers bachelor's and master's degrees in engineering to its 650+ student strength.

Campus 

The college campus has basketball courts, tennis courts, two field hockey grounds and two cricket grounds. All the grounds are huge. There are table tennis tables at the college. The auditorium is newly constructed and has the capacity to seat 1000 people.

The laboratories are state-of-the-art and there is an on-campus cafeteria serving food to staff and students. A swimming pool is under construction and will be ready in two years.

The campus offers hostel facilities to out-station students at a negligible expense. The library is one of the finest among private engineering colleges in Chennai with close to 30,000 journals, technical books and newspapers from across the country.

Education system 

TPEC follows a trimester system as followed by the Indian Institutes of Management.

In a bachelor's degree, the first few trimesters consist of base engineering courses followed by the specialized courses in the later trimesters. A student can finish a conventional four-year bachelor's degree within 3.5 years in an ideal situation. The course starts in June and ends in November, the final trimester being a research/industry-oriented project.

For a master's degree, the course is 1.5 years long. The trimesters start in June and end in March for the Masters programme.

Recently, a satellite campus was opened at Bangalore to forge stronger links with the IT industry. This campus is being used to conduct industrial research and professional trainings. The faculty at Chennai are given an option to spend a two-year rotation at this campus after which they move back to the Chennai head-campus.

Zenith
Zenith is the annual engineering symposium of the college, and the standards set at this event are used as the benchmark for similar events of such nature in Chennai and India.

See also
 Anna University, Chennai

Engineering colleges in Chennai
Educational institutions established in 2003
2003 establishments in Tamil Nadu